Dread Champions of the Last Days is the debut album of the Christian metalcore band, Sleeping Giant. Multiple members of the band, xDEATHSTARx, contributed to this album. It is the only album to feature Cory Johnson, who would later join Impending Doom.

Track listing

Credits
Sleeping Giant
 Travis Boyd - Drums, backing vocals
 Tom Green - Vocals 
 Cory Johnson - Guitar
 Geoff Brouillette - Guitar

Additional musicians
 Ryan Bermuda -  Backing vocals
 Brook Reeves (Impending Doom) - Vocals 
 Bruce - Vocals
 Burak 'Loomis The Turk' Erin - Backing vocals
 Charles Bybee - Backing vocals
 Kevin Davis - Backing vocals
 Eric "E-Money" Gregson - Backing vocals
 Ron Fox - Backing vocals
 Stafford Heppenstall - Backing vocals 
 Tom Brady - Bass guitar

Production
 Joe Marchiano - Mastering, mixing
 Dave Quiggle - Artwork, layout design, backing vocals

References

External links
http://www.allmusic.com/album/dread-champions-of-the-last-days-mw0000577768/credits
http://www.last.fm/music/Sleeping+Giant/Dread+Champions+Of+The+Last+Days

Sleeping Giant (band) albums
Facedown Records albums
2007 debut albums